Scooby-Doo on Zombie Island is a 1998 American direct-to-video animated mystery comedy horror film based on the Scooby-Doo franchise. In the film, Shaggy, Scooby, Fred, Velma and Daphne reunite after a year-long hiatus from Mystery, Inc. to investigate a bayou island said to be haunted by the ghost of the pirate Morgan Moonscar. The film was directed by Jim Stenstrum, from a screenplay by Glenn Leopold.

Popularity for Scooby-Doo had grown in the 1990s due to reruns aired on Cartoon Network. The channel's parent company, Time Warner, suggested developing a direct-to-video (DTV) film on the property. The team at Hanna-Barbera consisted of many veteran artists and writers. Many of the original voice actors of the series were replaced for the film, although Frank Welker returned to voice Fred Jones. It was also the first of four Scooby-Doo direct-to-video films to be animated overseas by Japanese animation studio Mook Animation. Rock bands Third Eye Blind and Skycycle contribute to the film's soundtrack. The film is dedicated to Don Messick, Scooby-Doo's original voice actor who died on October 24, 1997, 11 months before the film's release.

Zombie Island contains a darker tone than most Scooby-Doo productions, and is notable for containing real supernatural creatures rather than people in costumes. The film was released on September 22, 1998 and received acclaim from critics, who complimented its animation and story. The film is also notable for being the first Scooby-Doo production featuring the entire gang (sans Scrappy-Doo) since The New Scooby-Doo Mysteries episode A Halloween Hassle at Dracula’s Castle, which premiered on ABC on October 27, 1984. The film was aided by a $50 million promotional campaign, and sponsorship deals with multiple companies. Sales of the film on VHS were high, and it became the first in a long-running series of DTV Scooby-Doo films. At least, it also made first TV debut in October 31, 1998 on Cartoon Network.

Two decades after the film's release, Warner Bros. Animation developed a sequel, Return to Zombie Island, released in 2019.

Plot

Mystery, Inc. goes their separate ways after becoming bored of mystery-solving due to their monstrous culprits always being people in costumes. Daphne Blake, along with Fred Jones, starts running a successful television series, determined to hunt down a real ghost rather than a fake one. Fred contacts Velma Dinkley, Shaggy Rogers and his dog Scooby-Doo, and the entire gang is brought back together for Daphne's birthday. They embark on a road trip scouting haunted locations across the U.S. for Daphne's show, only to encounter more fake monsters. Arriving in New Orleans, Louisiana, they are invited by a young woman named Lena Dupree to visit her workplace at Moonscar Island, an island allegedly haunted by the ghost of the pirate Morgan Moonscar. Though they are skeptical, the gang agrees. On the island, they meet ferryman Jacques, Lena's employer Simone Lenoir, who lives in a large mansion on a pepper plantation, and Simone's gardener Beau. Shaggy and Scooby encounter the ghost of Moonscar, who becomes a zombie while the gang receives several ghostly warnings to leave. Despite this, they stay overnight, still skeptical.

That night, Shaggy and Scooby are chased by a horde of zombies. Velma suspects Beau while Fred and Daphne capture a zombie, believing it is a human culprit until Fred pulls its head off, revealing that the zombies are real. As the horde chases them, the gang gets separated in the chaos and Daphne accidentally causes Fred to drop his video camera in quicksand, losing film evidence for their show. In a cave, Shaggy and Scooby discover wax voodoo dolls resembling Fred, Velma, and Daphne and play with them, involuntarily controlling their friends until the pair disturb a nest of bats.

The rest of the gang and Beau discover a secret passageway in the house, where Lena claims the zombies dragged Simone away. The passageway leads to a secret chamber for voodoo rituals, where Velma confronts Lena about her lie, having seen her footprints instead of drag marks. After trapping the gang with the voodoo dolls, Simone and Lena reveal themselves and Jacques as werecats. Simone explains that 200 years ago, she and Lena were part of a group of settlers on the island who worshiped a cat god. When Moonscar and his crew invaded the island, they chased the settlers into the bayou, where they were eaten alive by alligators, but Simone and Lena escaped. They prayed to their cat god to curse Moonscar and were transformed into immortal werecats. They killed the pirates, but later realized that invoking the cat god's power had also cursed them. Every harvest moon since, they lured and exploited victims to drain their lives and preserve their immortality, hiring Jacques along the way to facilitate their plot in exchange for making him immortal, with the zombies and ghosts being their previous victims who awaken every harvest moon to try to scare people away to prevent them from suffering the same fate.

While being chased by Jacques, Shaggy and Scooby disrupt the werecats' draining ceremony, allowing the gang to free themselves. The werecats surround them, but realize too late that the harvest moon has passed, causing them to crumble to dust and allowing the zombies' souls to rest in peace. Beau reveals himself as an undercover police officer who was sent to investigate disappearances on the island. Daphne asks Beau to guest star on her show, and they all leave the island in the morning.

Voice cast
 Scott Innes as Scooby-Doo
 Billy West as Shaggy Rogers
 Mary Kay Bergman as Daphne Blake
Frank Welker as Fred Jones, Simone Lenoir's Cats, Owl, Zombie
 B. J. Ward as Velma Dinkley
 Adrienne Barbeau as Simone Lenoir
 Tara Charendoff as Lena Dupree
 Cam Clarke as Detective Beau Neville
 Jim Cummings as Jacques, Morgan Moonscar, Plantationer
 Mark Hamill as Snakebite Scruggs, Airport manager
 Jennifer Leigh Warren as Chris
 Ed Gilbert as Mr. Beeman

Production

Origins and story

The Scooby-Doo franchise, which by the time of the film's release was nearing its 30-year mark, had entered into a period of diminishing returns in the early 1990s. After the conclusion of the sixth iteration of the series, A Pup Named Scooby-Doo, the character became absent from Saturday-morning lineups. In 1991, Turner Broadcasting System purchased Hanna-Barbera, the animation studio behind Scooby, largely to fill programming at a new, 24/7 cable channel centered on animated properties: Cartoon Network. The advent of cable gave the franchise renewed popularity: rapidly, Scooby reruns attracted top ratings. Zombie Island was not the first attempt at a feature-length Scooby adventure; several television films were produced in the late 1980s starring the character, such as Scooby-Doo and the Ghoul School. In 1996, Turner merged with Time Warner.  Davis Doi, in charge at Hanna-Barbera, was tasked with developing projects based on the studio's existing property. Warner executives suggested Scooby, given that the property held a high Q Score, and proposed it could be a direct-to-video feature film.

The team assembled, to work on the production were veterans of the animation business, and had most recently worked on SWAT Kats: The Radical Squadron and The Real Adventures of Jonny Quest. Screenwriter Glenn Leopold had been with the franchise since 1979's Scooby-Doo and Scrappy-Doo. The film was directed by Jim Stenstrum, who had worked on Scooby projects beginning in 1983's The New Scooby and Scrappy-Doo Show. As the film was considered a one-off experiment by studio brass, the crew worked with little oversight and complete creative freedom. Doi and Leopold developed the film's story, with Leopold receiving sole credit for the screenplay. Much of the script is recycled from Leopold's script for the unfinished SWAT Kats episode "The Curse of Kataluna". Stenstrum and Doi suggested in early story meetings that the monsters in the film be real (previous Scooby outings were nearly always "bad guys" in rubber masks), feeling it worked for a half-hour television episode, but might grow tiresome over a feature-length film. Leopold disagreed, noting that throughout the franchise's history, it always remained a simple, solvable mystery. Lance Falk, who worked as model coordinator on the film, suggested they combine both ideas.

Casting
Casey Kasem was originally set to reprise his role as Shaggy, but Kasem, a vegetarian, had refused to voice Shaggy in a 1995 Burger King commercial and went on to demand that Shaggy also give up eating meat in future productions. The creative team rejected this, as eating anything was a hallmark of the character. Additionally, production on Zombie Island had already begun, with the film featuring a scene with Shaggy eating crawfish. Shaggy was recast with voice actor Billy West. Kasem was given a last-minute opportunity to fill the role and redub over West, but he again refused. Radio personality Scott Innes voiced Scooby-Doo, as Don Messick, the character's original voice actor, retired in 1996 and died in 1997; Zombie Island was dedicated to his memory. Heather North was set to reprise her role as Daphne, but after a day of recording, Mary Kay Bergman replaced her, while B. J. Ward, who played Velma in a Johnny Bravo crossover episode, reprised her role for this film.

Frank Welker is the only actor from the original series to reprise his role, as Fred Jones. He had initially worried that the producers would replace him as well, given that the producers believed his voice had gone down an octave. The voice director kept requesting Welker perform the voice at a higher pitch. Welker insisted his voice was the same, as Fred's voice is close to his natural speaking voice. The team went back and viewed early Scooby-Doo episodes and found that Welker's impression was more or less the same. Bob Miller, of Animation World Network, suggested that the reruns of Scooby-Doo aired on Cartoon Network perhaps gave them a false idea of the character's voice, as the episodes were typically time-compressed (or sped-up) to allow more room for commercials, thus giving all of the show's soundtrack a higher pitch.

Animation
Japanese animation studio Mook Animation were contracted to work on the film; Doi had a relationship with the team at Mook as they had previously collaborated on Swat Kats and Jonny Quest. Hiroshi Aoyama and Kazumi Fukushima directed the overseas animation, but are not credited on the picture. The film was animated and is presented in standard 1.33:1 full frame format. The team were allowed more time to work on the film, as there was no real set schedule—just delivery to the home video department upon completion. The American crew re-designed the series cast for the film, giving them a fashion update. The team felt Fred and Daphne, with their ascots and Fred's bell-bottoms, felt very dated to the 60's (although the original designs were used in the opening scene). They briefly changed Shaggy's shirt color to red and gave him sneakers, though they quickly relented, as they viewed his original outfit as more timeless.

The group were trusted by the studio's management as they had worked together for a long time, and all involved on the film had a real passion for the project. Drew Gentle was the main background designer for the project, with Falk contributing to the film's color key. Occasionally, the crew would hire freelance artists to contribute to ancillary designs. In addition, the group enlisted the assistance of Iwao Takamoto, the original designer of Scooby-Doo, still on salary at Hanna-Barbera, for advising on scenes. Takamoto called the film "a good solid mystery", and storyboarded several sequences of interplay between Shaggy and Scooby.

Music
Composer Steven Bramson, who is known for Tiny Toon Adventures, JAG and the Lost in Space film, scored and conducted the film. The soundtrack for the film features three songs composed specifically for the film. "The Ghost Is Here" and "It's Terror Time Again", both written by Glenn Leopold, were performed by Skycycle. The title track, "Scooby-Doo, Where Are You!", was performed by Third Eye Blind.

Release
Originally, the film was planned to be released theatrically, but when Warner Bros noticed the strong market on home media, particularly their successful direct-to-video animated Batman films, it was later decided to release it on VHS on September 22, 1998, through Warner Home Video. Because of the cost of production, the tape retailed at $19.95, which was higher than other direct-to-video titles of that era. Sales for the film exceeded the studio's expectations, according to a 1999 Billboard article. It was released on DVD on March 6, 2001, and later re-released in 2008 as a double-feature on DVD alongside the third direct-to-video Scooby film, Scooby-Doo and the Alien Invaders (2000).

The film was aided by a reportedly $50 million promotional push, as advertisers believed the character's iconic nature would generate strong sales, and deserved "equal visibility to a theatrical release." Tie-ins included the Campbell Soup Company, SpaghettiOs, 1-800-COLLECT, Wendy's, LEGO, and Cartoon Network, who debuted the film on television on October 31, 1998, after a month themed after the series. It was also promoted as part of the network's "Wacky Racing" sponsorship deal with Melling Racing in 1998, as the third of four paint schemes featured on the NASCAR Winston Cup Series #9 Ford Taurus driven by then-rookie Jerry Nadeau. The paint scheme debuted at Richmond International Raceway in the Exide NASCAR Select Batteries 400 on September 12, 1998, and was featured on the car through the Dura Lube Kmart 500 at Phoenix International Raceway on October 25, 1998, for a total of seven races out of the thirty-three race schedule. The promotional push was, at the time, the biggest marketing support in Warner Bros. Family Entertainment's history.

Reception
The film received positive reviews from critics, and currently holds a "Fresh" rating of 88% on Rotten Tomatoes. Donald Liebenson of the Chicago Tribune described the film as "ambitious" and calls it "a nostalgic hoot [that] resurrects all the touchstones of the original cartoons." Entertainment Weekly Joe Neumaier praised the film as "Fast, fun, and filled with knowing winks, the mystery honors the show’s beloved structure, but writ large." A 1998 New York Times article by Peter M. Nichols complimented the film as "well-made." Lynne Heffley at the Los Angeles Times called the film "more entertaining than you'd expect, despite the familiar Saturday morning-type animation."

Later assessments of the film have been similarly positive. Michael Mallory at the Los Angeles Times credited it and its subsequent features for "[spinning] the characters into more modern treatments of action and horror, and toyed with [a] self-spoofing quality."

In 2011–12, British comedian Stewart Lee dedicated an extensive section of his live show Carpet Remnant World to the "jungle canyon rope bridges" in Scooby-Doo on Zombie Island, linking what he described as the parlous state of such bridges with the austerity regime of Prime Minister Margaret Thatcher.

Sequel
A direct sequel, titled Scooby-Doo! Return to Zombie Island, had its world premiere at the San Diego Comic-Con on July 21, 2019, followed by a digital release on September 3, 2019, and a DVD release on October 1, 2019.

References

External links

 
 

1998 films
1998 animated films
1998 direct-to-video films
1990s American animated films
1990s monster movies
American direct-to-video films
American comedy horror films
American comedy mystery films
American haunted house films
Animated films about cats
American supernatural horror films
American monster movies
Films about Voodoo
Films about shapeshifting
Warner Bros. Animation animated films
Warner Bros. direct-to-video animated films
Films directed by Jim Stenstrum
Films about curses
Films about immortality
Films set in Louisiana
Films set in New Orleans
Films set on fictional islands
Scooby-Doo direct-to-video animated films
American zombie films
American zombie comedy films
Films scored by Steven Bramson
Hanna-Barbera animated films
American children's animated mystery films
American children's animated comedy films
1990s children's animated films
1990s English-language films
Southern Gothic films
Gothic horror films